The canton of Saint-Genis-Pouilly is an administrative division of the Ain department, in eastern France. It was created at the French canton reorganisation which came into effect in March 2015. Its seat is in Saint-Genis-Pouilly.

It consists of the following communes:
Ferney-Voltaire 
Ornex
Prévessin-Moëns
Saint-Genis-Pouilly

References

Cantons of Ain